U. maculata may refer to:

 Uapou maculata, a linyphiid spider
 Urodeta maculata, a Namibian moth
 Uropeltis maculata, a shield tail snake
 Usnea maculata, an old man's beard